Castello del Terriccio is an Italian winery in Tuscany near the Tyrrhenian Sea. Proprietor Dr. Gian Annibale Rossi di Medelana noted the success of Sassicaia and intends to make his own version. Its grand vin is the eponymous Castello del Terriccio. 
The vineyard introduced Lupicaia in the 1993 vintage; it is a Cabernet Sauvignon-based red wine blend with Merlot and Petit Verdot. The component wine varieties of Lupicaia  ferment separately in stainless steel tanks, and  aged in barrique for 18 to 24 months before blending and bottling.

Wine criticism
The 2010 vintage was given a score of 95 by Wine Advocate. The 2005 vintage was given a score of 18/20 by Jancis Robinson.

References

External links

History of Tuscan wine

Wineries of Italy